Ranger is a town in Gordon County, Georgia, United States. The population was 131 at the 2010 census, up from 85 in 2000.

History
A post office called Ranger has been in operation since 1891. It is uncertain whether the town was named after Ranger, North Carolina, or the Confederate rangers.

The Georgia General Assembly incorporated Ranger as a town in 1910.

Geography

Ranger is located in eastern Gordon County at  (34.500175, -84.711392). U.S. Route 411 passes through the center of town, leading north  to Chatsworth and south  to Fairmount.

Demographics

As of the 2010 census there were 131 people, 46 households, and 39 families.

As of the census of 2000, there were 85 people, 33 households, and 23 families residing in the town. The racial makeup of the town was 100.00% White. Hispanic or Latino people of any race were 2.35% of the population.

There were 33 households, out of which 18.2% had children under the age of 18 living with them, 54.5% were married couples living together, 12.1% had a female householder with no husband present, and 27.3% were non-families. 21.2% of all households were made up of individuals, and 6.1% had someone living alone who was 65 years of age or older. The average household size was 2.27 and the average family size was 2.58.

In the town, the population was spread out, with 12.9% under the age of 18, 5.9% from 18 to 24, 22.4% from 25 to 44, 30.6% from 45 to 64, and 28.2% who were 65 years of age or older. The median age was 50 years. For every 100 females, there were 97.7 males. For every 100 females age 18 and over, there were 94.7 males.

The median income for a household in the town was $26,875, and the median income for a family was $33,750. Males had a median income of $30,000 versus $23,750 for females. The per capita income for the town was $15,224. There were 13.3% of families and 8.8% of the population living below the poverty line, including no under eighteens and none of those over 64.

Notable people
Tom Graves, U.S. congressman
Robert D. McTeer, economist

References

Towns in Gordon County, Georgia
Towns in Georgia (U.S. state)